Ryno Pieterse (born ) is a South African rugby union player for Castres in Top 14. His regular position is lock.

He signed for the Bulls Super Rugby side for the 2020 Super Rugby season.

References

External links
 
Castres profile

South African rugby union players
Living people
1998 births
Rugby union locks
Bulls (rugby union) players
Castres Olympique players
Rugby union players from Mpumalanga